Bussmann is a surname. Notable people with the surname include:

Gaëtan Bussmann (born 1991), French football player
Jane Bussmann, comedian and author who has written for television and radio
Nicholas Bussmann, composer and performer

See also
Bussmann and Quantick Kingsize, short-lived radio programme that aired from April to May 1998